Buffalo Bill is an American sitcom television series that featured the misadventures of an egotistical talk show host, played by Dabney Coleman, and his staff (including Geena Davis and Joanna Cassidy) at WBFL-TV, a small TV station in Buffalo, New York. It premiered June 1, 1983, on NBC and ran for two seasons (1983–84). It was also shown on the then-new UK fourth TV channel Channel 4.

Characters
 Dabney Coleman as "Buffalo" Bill Bittinger
 Joanna Cassidy as Joanna "Jo-Jo" White, no-nonsense producer of the talk show
 Max Wright as Karl Shub, WBFL's station manager
 John Fiedler as Woodrow "Woody" Deschler
 Geena Davis as Wendy Killian, production assistant
 Charlie Robinson as Newdell Springs
 Meshach Taylor as Tony
 Claude Earl Jones as Stan (recurring)
 Pippa Pearthree as Melanie Bittinger, Bill's (estranged) daughter

Synopsis
Most of the humor came from Bill's completely unredeemable qualities and from the staff's frustration at dealing with him.

US television ratings

Episodes
In 2005, Lionsgate released the entire series on Region 1 DVD.

Season 1: 1983

Season 2: 1983–84

Reception
The series received 11 Emmy Award nominations (including two for Outstanding Comedy Series). Joanna Cassidy also won a Golden Globe Award in 1984. In 1999, TV Guide ranked Bill Bittinger number 42 on its 50 Greatest TV Characters of All Time list. Former NBC President Brandon Tartikoff wrote in his memoirs that his biggest professional regret was canceling the show.

References

External links 
 
 
 Buffalo Bill at Jumptheshark.com

1983 American television series debuts
1984 American television series endings
1980s American sitcoms
1980s American workplace comedy television series
NBC original programming
Television shows set in Buffalo, New York
Television series about television
English-language television shows